Eleanor Roosevelt High School is a small public high school on the Upper East Side of Manhattan in New York City. Eleanor Roosevelt High School is composed of about 33 teachers and 500 students representing over 40 countries. Initially opened at a temporary location in Chelsea, with 105 ninth graders and a staff of eight, ERHS currently has over 500 students and over 45 staff members. Every year, the school selects 125 to 140 students out of over 6,000 applicants and is often selected over specialized high schools by students looking for a more liberal curriculum. In 2021, Eleanor Roosevelt High School was ranked the 81st best public high school in the nation by U.S. News & World Report.

Academics
Eleanor Roosevelt High School offers a comprehensive college preparatory program with Advanced Placement (AP) offerings, electives, and opportunities for college credit.

Extracurricular activities

Varsity sports
ERHS is a member of the PSAL.
 Baseball (Men)
 Basketball (Men)
 Basketball (Women)
 Softball (Women)
 Soccer (Men)
 Soccer (Women)
 Tennis (Men)
 Tennis (Women)
 Track and field (Coed)

Club sports
 Cross Country (Coed)
 Baseball (Men's)
 Softball (Women's)
 Fencing (Coed)
 Volleyball (Women's)

Notable alumni

References

 (?)

External links
 Eleanor Roosevelt High School — official website

Public high schools in Manhattan
Educational institutions established in 2002
Upper East Side
2002 establishments in New York City